NZR P class could refer to one of these classes of locomotives operated by New Zealand Railways:

 NZR P class (1876)
 NZR P class (1885)